Poland–Lithuania may refer to:

 Polish–Lithuanian union from 1385 until 1569
 Polish–Lithuanian Commonwealth from 1569 until 1795

See also 
 Polish–Lithuanian (disambiguation)